Mallika Prasad (née Bhandary) is a former Indian politician from Bharatiya Janata Party and she was MLA representing the Puttur constituency.

In 2008 Karnataka assembly elections, she contested against Congress leader Bondala Jagannath Shetty and Shakunthala T. Shetty of Swabhiman Vedike, and won by a margin of 1425 votes.

References

External links
Mallika Prasad

Bharatiya Janata Party politicians from Karnataka
Living people
Year of birth missing (living people)
Karnataka MLAs 2008–2013
People from Dakshina Kannada district
21st-century Indian women politicians
21st-century Indian politicians
Women members of the Karnataka Legislative Assembly